Zoopark was one of the founding rock groups which began the Russian rock movement.  The group was founded in 1981.

Background
It consisted of singer-songwriter Mike Naumenko, guitarist Aleksandr Khrabunov and a varied group of artists. The first album recorded was All Brothers Are Sisters with Boris Grebenshchikov in 1978. They recorded on the banks of the Neva River in Leningrad (now Saint Petersburg) with a "choir" of drunken friends and colleagues playing percussion on metal cans. Naumenko was a rock outcast, concentrating his work on electrified hard-core blues, although his Russian-language poetic songwriting made him a favorite in the hippie underground. His inspirations included Lou Reed, Bob Dylan, T. Rex, B.B. King and Chuck Berry.

Legacy
Naumenko died in 1991, cutting his career short.  He remains celebrated, however, as a pioneer of Russian rock music, with his birthday observed in St. Petersburg clubs, along with numerous creative tributes, including a 2009 novel and a "blues opera" that premiered in 2011. A collection of Naumenko's complete written works—including his samizdat translation of Richard Bach's Illusions—was being prepared for publication in 2015.

Discography
 1981: Blues de Moscou
 1983: Small Town Called N (Уездный город N)
 1984: White Stripe (Белая полоса)
 1985: Life in the Zoo (Жизнь в Зоопарке)
 1987: W
 1987: Illusions (Иллюзии)
 1991: Soundtrack for the movie (Музыка для фильма)

References

External links
 Zoopark's Discography 
 
 
 Mike Naumenko

Musical groups established in 1981
Musical groups disestablished in 1991
1980s in music
Blues rock groups
Musical groups from Saint Petersburg
Russian rock music groups
Soviet rock music groups
1981 establishments in Russia
1991 disestablishments in Russia